Zabala may refer to:

Zabala (surname)
Zabala (Sumer), a city of ancient Mesopotamia
Zăbala, a commune in Covasna County, Romania
Zabala fruit
Zabala (candy), a brand of milk caramel from Uruguay